Porous pot cell refers to the construction of an electromotive cell using unglazed pottery as a barrier and may refer to;

The Daniell cell
The Leclanché cell